Ponakan Baruah   is an Indian politician member of  Asom Gana Parishad from Assam.  He is an MLA, elected from the  Chabua constituency in the 2021 Assam Legislative Assembly election.

References 

  Asom Gana Parishad politicians 
Living people
People from Dibrugarh district
Assam MLAs 2021–2026
Year of birth missing (living people)